Alexander Peya and Bruno Soares were the defending champions, but lost in the first round to Guillermo García-López and Philipp Oswald.
García-López and Oswald went on to win the title, defeating Juan Sebastián Cabal and Robert Farah in the final, 5–7, 6–4, [15–13].

Seeds

  Alexander Peya /  Bruno Soares (first round)
  Juan Sebastián Cabal /  Robert Farah (final)
  Andre Begemann /  Martin Emmrich (quarterfinals)
  Pablo Cuevas /  Horacio Zeballos (quarterfinals)

Draw

Draw

References
 Main Draw

Brasil Open - Doubles
2014 Brasil Open